Pavlo Yakovlevich Meshyk (Pavel Meshyk; 1910 – 23 December 1953) was a Ukrainian Soviet security operative and NKVD officer.

Meshyk was born in a family of clerks in Konotop. After graduating from Konotop school, in 1925–1930 he worked as a repairman at Konotop Mechanical Factory. At the factory, Meshyk graduated the school of FZU and in 1930 in Kamianets-Podilskyi he finished university preparatory courses. In October 1931 Meshyk with a "Komsomol voyage ticket" enrolled into the Electrical Power Institute in Samara, but already in March 1932 on the party's selection he was directed to work at OGPU.

After finishing the OGPU College (1932–1933), Meshyk worked in the central office of OGPU–NKVD in Moscow in economic and counterintelligence departments (assistant commissioner of Division 1 of the GUGB (OGPU) Economic Department (EKO), 1933–1935; operational commissioner of Division 2 of the GUGB EKO, later Division 14 (Vneshtorg, trade offices) of the GUGB Department 3 (counterintelligence), 1935–1937).

List of leadership position Meshyk held afterwards:
 1937–1938 assistant chief of Division 14 of the GUGB Department 3
 1939 assistant chief of the NKVD Investigational Section
 1939–1940 chief of the NKVD Main Economic Directorate (GEU) Investigational Section
 1940–1941 chief of the NKVD GEU Department 1
 1941 People's Commissar of State Security of the UkrSSR
 1941–1943 chief of the NKVD Economic Directorate (EKU)
 1941 chief of the NKVD Special Department 7 (production of weaponry)
 1942 chief of the NKVD EKU Department 1 (aviation)
 1943–1945 assistant chief of the NKO Main Directorate of Counterintelligence (GUKR) SMERSH
 1945 NKVD commissioner of the First Ukrainian Front
 1945 advisor to Ministry of General Administration at the Provisional Government of the Republic of Poland (including the Provisional Government of National Unity)

Upon his return from Poland, Meshyk worked for the Soviet atomic bomb project:
 1945–1953 assistant chief of the First Main Directorate (Sovnarkom – Sovmin of USSR)
 1953 Minister of Internal Affairs of the UkrSSR (on initiative of Lavrentiy Beria)

On 30 June 1953 Meshyk was arrested in Kiev. On 23 December 1953 he was sentenced by Special court presence (Spetsialnoye sudebnoye prisutstvie) of the Supreme Court of USSR to "VMN" (i.e. capital punishment) on the "case of Beria gang". Meshyk was executed by shooting. He was stripped of all awards and titles. Meshyk was partially rehabilitated when on 29 May 2000 the Military Collegium of the Supreme Court of the Russian Federation requalified corpus delicti (body of the crime) to "Excess of power and abuse of office that led to severe consequences", execution by shooting changed to 25 years of imprisonment without confiscation of personal property.

Awards
 Order of Lenin (1949)
 2 Order of the Red Banner (1943, 1944)
 2 Order of Kutuzov (1st degree, 1945)
 Order of the Red Banner of Labour (1942)
 Order of the Red Star (1940)
 Order of the Badge of Honour (1937)
 Merited NKVD agent (1941)

References

External links
 Pavlo Meshyk at Shield and Sword

1910 births
1953 deaths
People from Konotop
People from Konotopsky Uyezd
Soviet interior ministers of Ukraine
Republican KGB chairmen (Ukraine)
Soviet lieutenant generals